PDG is the second largest real estate company in Brazil, after Cyrela Brazil Realty and has its focus on the popular segment. The company became listed in January 2007 in the corporate index Novo Mercado of BM&F Bovespa and in 2010, became part of the Ibovespa index, but was removed in 2016, because its shares fell by around 95%. PDG Realty its based in Rio de Janeiro.

It was also the champion in customer complaints in 2013, 2014, and 2015.

The company's strategy aims at growth through investments in subsidiaries and direct investment in projects. Today, the PDG have control of most of its consolidated capital, the noteworthy Goldfarb and CHL, companies 100% PDG. The company are present in 56 cities and 11 states within Brazil, and rely on projects in Argentina. Its real estate projects include residential projects for various class, from the economy segment (focus) to high-income, developing luxury condominiums and investments in ventures with a focus on generating income through leasing; develops residential lots; invests in commercial real estate projects; and commercializes residential and commercial properties. The company also involves in real estate brokerage and consulting business.

Currently the company is the  second largest real estate and homebuilder company in Brazil by revenue Cyrela Brazil Realty.

References 

Companies listed on B3 (stock exchange)
Real estate companies of Brazil
Construction and civil engineering companies of Brazil
Companies based in Rio de Janeiro (city)
Construction and civil engineering companies established in 1979
Brazilian companies established in 1979